Gonzalo Germán Córdoba (born 29 March 2000) is an Argentine professional footballer who plays as a midfielder for the Argentine Primera División club Racing Club .

Club career
Córdoba signed his first professional contract with Racing Club in 2016, and was promoted to their first team in 2018. He was loaned to Argentine club Barracas Central in 2019. He made his professional debut with Barracas Central in a 1–0 Primera Nacional win over Independiente Rivadavia on 11 March 2019. He moved to the Chilean club Universidad de Concepción in 2019, before returning to Racing Club in 2021.

International career
Córdoba is a youth international for Argentina, having represented the Argentina U15s.

References

External links
 
 Racing Club Profile
 

2000 births
Living people
Sportspeople from Avellaneda
Argentine footballers
Argentina youth international footballers
Association football midfielders
Racing Club de Avellaneda footballers
Barracas Central players
Universidad de Concepción footballers
Argentine Primera División players
Primera Nacional players
Chilean Primera División players
Primera B de Chile players
Argentine expatriate footballers
Argentine expatriate sportspeople in Chile
Expatriate footballers in Chile